Tarlochan Singh Bedi is an academician better known for translating the Kural into Punjabi.

Biography
With a master of arts degree and a doctorate, Tarlochan Singh Bedi served as principal of the Government College of Education at Faridkot, Punjab. Bedi has written articles on the cultural and linguistic similarities between Tamil and Punjabi. Bedi is married to Professor Darshan Kaur Bedi and has two sons. His elder son Arvinder Singh Bedi is a state manager of Magma, a finance company, and based at Ludhiana. His younger son Gagandeep Singh is Commissioner of Greater Chennai Corporation, known for his tsunami rehabilitation work in 2004 during his tenure as district collector in Cuddalore.

In 2000, Bedi attended a seminar organised by the Tamil Department of the Madurai Kamaraj University, where he was requested by the university's vice chancellor Dr. Salihu, who chaired the seminar, to translate the Kural text into Punjabi. Finding similarities between the ideas of Guru Nanak and those in the Kural text, Bedi started translating the Kural into Punjabi and completed it in 2012, which was published by the Central Institute of Classical Tamil in Chennai. According to Bedi, "the focal point of the Tirukkural is feelings of love for human beings, which is what Guru Nanak preached too."

See also

 Tirukkural translations
 Tirukkural translations into Punjabi
 List of translators

References

Further reading
 Tarlochan Singh Bedi. (2012). Tirukkural in Punjabi, Central Institute of Classical Tamil. 296 pages. 

Tamil–Punjabi translators
Translators of the Tirukkural into Punjabi
Living people
Year of birth missing (living people)
Tirukkural translators